The cream-throated white-eye (Zosterops atriceps) is a species of bird in the family Zosteropidae. It is endemic to the northern Moluccas.

Its natural habitats are subtropical or tropical moist lowland forest and subtropical or tropical mangrove forest. They can be found on the Maluku Utara in Indonesia.

References

cream-throated white-eye
Birds of the Maluku Islands
cream-throated white-eye
cream-throated white-eye
Taxonomy articles created by Polbot